The 1984 Nippon Professional Baseball season was the 35th season of operation for the league.

Regular season standings

Central League

Pacific League

Japan Series

Hiroshima Toyo Carp won the series 4–3.

See also
1984 Major League Baseball season

References

1984 in baseball
1984 in Japanese sport